Lo Chang-fa (born 1956) is a Taiwanese jurist.

Lo completed a bachelor's degree in law at Fu Jen Catholic University, followed by a Master of Law at the National Taiwan University College of Law. He obtained a second Master of Law degree at Harvard Law School, and remained at Harvard to pursue a Doctor of Juridical Science. Lo returned to Taiwan and practiced law in Taipei before he joined the faculty of the NTU College of Law, where he was appointed chair and distinguished professor. During his tenure as dean of the college of law, he founded two academic journals, the Asian Journal of WTO and International Health Law and Policy in 2006 and the Contemporary Asia Arbitration Journal in 2008. In 2008, Lo was appointed to the Permanent Group of Experts at the World Trade Organization's Committee on Subsidies and Countervailing Measures. Lo was nominated to serve as a Justice of the Constitutional Court in 2011. During his nomination, media reported that Lo held Canadian permanent residency. Both Lo and fellow nominee Chen Be-yue, a former American citizen and permanent resident, told the Legislative Yuan that they would not pursue permanent residency or dual citizenship. After legislative confirmation, Lo took office on 1 October 2011. Lo completed his eight year term as justice on 30 September 2019. In July 2020, Lo was nominated to serve as Taiwan's representative to the World Trade Organization, to fill a position that had been vacant since Cyrus Chu's resignation in September 2019.

References

1956 births
Living people
20th-century Taiwanese lawyers
21st-century Taiwanese judges
Harvard Law School alumni
Fu Jen Catholic University alumni
National Taiwan University alumni
Taiwanese expatriates in the United States
Taiwanese expatriates in Canada
Law school deans
Taiwanese university and college faculty deans
Academic staff of the National Taiwan University
Taiwanese legal scholars
Representatives of Taiwan